The Africa Movie Academy Award for Best Costume Design is an annual merit by the Africa Film Academy to reward films with the best costume for the year. It was introduced in 2005 as Best Costume

References

Lists of award winners
Africa Movie Academy Awards
Awards for film costume design